Woolhampton is a village and civil parish in West Berkshire, England. The village straddles the Bath road between the towns of Reading,  to the east, and Newbury,  to the west.

Geography
The village homes are clustered on the northern side of the plain of the River Kennet, with the Berkshire Downs rising through the fields and woods of the village northwards. On the higher land some half mile to the north of the village is the adjacent settlement of Upper Woolhampton, which contains both the parish church and the village school. The A4 forms the main street of the village. An unclassified road runs to the south, towards the village of Brimpton. This crosses the railway line by the station on a level crossing, followed shortly afterwards by a swing bridge across the river and canal which share a common channel at this point. Woolhampton Lock lies just to the west. Two other unclassified roads leave the village to the north, climbing into the Berkshire Downs.

Transport
Besides the A4 road, the Reading to Taunton line and the Kennet and Avon Canal also pass through the village. Woolhampton is served by  railway station in the village.

Amenities
Because of its location on the Bath Road, Woolhampton was well known for its coaching inns. Only one of these, the Angel, survives on the main road, after the Falmouth Arms closed in 2014 and was converted to residential property. A second pub, the Rowbarge, is, as its name suggests, situated alongside the Kennet and Avon Canal next to the swing bridge.  The war memorial in Woolhampton was designed by Sir Robert Lorimer in 1920. The Woolhampton Reed Bed, a Site of Special Scientific Interest, lies alongside the River Kennet within the parish and to the south east of the village. The dense reed bed, with smaller areas of tall fen and carr wetlands, is notable for its nesting passerine bird populations and for the diversity of insects it supports.

Governance
The civil parish of Woolhampton also includes the adjacent settlement of Upper Woolhampton and the rural areas to the north, east and south of the village. It has a parish council, and also lies in the West Berkshire unitary authority district and the Newbury parliamentary constituency.

Demography

Nearest places

See also
 List of civil parishes in Berkshire

References

External links

 
Villages in Berkshire
Civil parishes in Berkshire
West Berkshire District
Kennet and Avon Canal